Cycling in Boston has been a popular activity since the late 19th century for both recreation and commuting, and it has grown in popularity in recent years, aided by improving cycling infrastructure. It is especially prevalent around the campuses of the numerous universities in the city.

Different areas in Boston have varying degrees of bike friendliness.

History 

At the end of the 19th century, cycling was especially popular in Boston, and Outing Magazine at the time described Boston as "the bicycling paradise of America". The city's cyclists were pivotal in the formation of the national organization League of American Wheelmen, and Massachusetts had the largest per capita membership in the league in the 1890s and the largest percentage of women members.

Bike sharing 

Bluebikes, the city's bicycle sharing system was launched on July 28, 2011, originally named Hubway, with 610 bicycles and 60 stations in the City of Boston. Later, the system was expended to Brookline, Cambridge, and Somerville. As of September 2016, the system has deployed 158 stations with a fleet of over 1,461 bikes. PBSC Urban Solutions, a company based in Montreal, Quebec, Canada, supplies bikes and docking stations.

The system is operated by Motivate. As of October 2014, it had more than 12,500 annual members, and an over 2.5 million trips have been taken by Hubway riders since 2011 launch. 

From May 9, 2018, the system was rebranded Bluebikes following a marketing deal with Blue Cross Blue Shield of Massachusetts.

Bike sharing companies Lime and Spin won a contract from the Metropolitan Area Planning Council to introduce dockless rentals to certain suburbs in summer 2018. Lime was already operating in Malden, and the MAPC system expands dockless rentals to Arlington, Bedford, Belmont, Chelsea, Everett, Malden, Medford, Melrose, Milton, Needham, Newton, Revere, Waltham, Watertown, and Winthrop. Dockless bikes are excluded from the Hubway operating area because that system has an exclusive contract with Boston, Brookline, Cambridge, and Somerville.

References

External links 
 Bikes | City of Boston
 Hubway
 Bicycle New England

Transportation in Boston
Boston
Boston